The Joint Cipher Bureau is an agency of the Indian armed forces responsible for signals intelligence and cryptanalysis and coordinating similar activities and operations of military intelligence agencies.It under Ministry of Defence (India) and it's employees are all civilian like Military Engineer Services (India) mostly attached to defence organization. 

The Joint Cipher Bureau works closely with the IB and R&AW. It is responsible for cryptanalysis and encryption  of sensitive data. The inter-services Joint Cipher Bureau has primary responsibility for cryptology and SIGINT, providing coordination and direction to the other military service organizations with similar mission. Most current equipment providing tactical intelligence is of Russian origin, including specialized direction finding and monitoring equipment.

The Joint Cipher Bureau is also responsible for issues relating to public and private key management. Cryptographic products are export-controlled licensed items, and licenses to India are not generally available for products of key length of more than 56 bits. The domestic Indian computer industry primarily produces PCs, and PC-compatible cryptographic products have been developed and are being used commercially. More robust cryptologic systems are not commercially produced in India, and progress in this field has been slow due to the general unavailability of technology and know-how. Customised cryptographic products have been designed and produced by organizations in the defence sector are engaged in the implementation of cryptographic techniques, protocols and the products.

Ranks and Hierarchy 
Ranks are divided into two groups

Group-A 

 Director
 Joint Director
 Deputy Director
 Senior Systems Security Officer-I
 Senior Systems Security Officer-I I

Group- B 

 System Security Officer
 Senior Technical Assistant
 Technical Assistant
 Programmer
 Junior Programmer
 Data Processing Assistant

References

Indian intelligence agencies
Signals intelligence agencies
Government agencies with year of establishment missing